Wheal Alfred is the site of a former copper and lead mine and a designated Site of Special Scientific Interest (SSSI) in west Cornwall, England, UK. The mine is famous to geologists for its important mineral specimens such as mimetite and pyromorphite.

References

Copper mines in Cornwall
Sites of Special Scientific Interest in Cornwall
Sites of Special Scientific Interest notified in 1990
Industrial archaeological sites in Cornwall